Typhoon Ora, known in the Philippines as Typhoon Konsing, was a June 1972 Category 1 typhoon that left 131 people dead and $15 million (1972 USD, $68.4 million 2005 USD) in damage.

Meteorological history

A tropical wave embedded in a trough formed on June 20 and moved westward without development. By June 23, the disturbance had strengthened, and became Tropical Storm Ora about 330 miles east of the Philippines.

Although poorly organized, Ora continued strengthening, becoming a Category 1 typhoon before encountering a high pressure system.

The area of high pressure forced the storm to make landfall on Luzon on June 25, emerging over the South China Sea later that day. Ora then continued its northwest track, turning northeast near Hainan Island and making landfall in southern China as a tropical storm. Ora then weakened and dissipated after moving inland.

Impact

Ora made landfall in the Philippines and again in southern China. The first landfall brought 115 mph gusts and 9.3 inches (236.2 mm) of rain in a 24-hour period to Luzon. Flashfloods from Ora damaged homes and businesses, and the storm surge caused many ships offshore to run aground. A sailboat capsized near Rapu Rapu during the storm, causing one fatality. Three others were declared missing. In the Philippines, Ora caused 131 deaths, left almost 400,000 people homeless and left behind $15 million (1972 USD, $68.4 million 2005 USD) worth of damage.

Oras second landfall was in southeastern China as a tropical storm on June 27, however deaths or damage during that landfall is unavailable.

See also

 Tropical cyclone

External links
 Ora report
 Ora 1972 best track data
 Ora 1972 Unisys track

1972 Pacific typhoon season
Typhoons
Typhoons in China
Typhoons in the Philippines
Typhoon Ora
Typhoon Ora
1972 disasters in Asia